The 2nd Army Aviation Support Regiment "Orione" is an Italian Army unit based at Borgo Panigale Airport near Bologna in Emilia Romagna. The regiment is part of the Italian army's army aviation and assigned to the Army Aviation Support Brigade. The regiment provides 2nd-line maintenance, upgrade and test services for the NH90 transport helicopters of the 3rd Special Operations Helicopter Regiment "Aldebaran", 5th Army Aviation Regiment "Rigel", and 7th Army Aviation Regiment "Vega".

History 
On 1 March 1957 the 2nd Army Light Aircraft Repairs Unit was formed in Bologna. In 1959 the unit was renamed 2nd Army Light Aviation Repairs Unit and in 1962 it moved from Bologna to the Borgo Panigale Airport. The unit consisted of a command, a command squadron, a supply section, an inspection and recovery section, an aircraft maintenance and repair section, a helicopter maintenance and repair section, and a subsystems repair section. The unit provided technical-logistical services for all of the army's flying units in northeastern Italy and the Tuscan-Emilian Military Region.

On 12 December 1989 the unit was granted its own flag by the President of the Italian Republic Francesco Cossiga. In 1990 the unit consisted of a command, an administration office, an aviation materiel office, a general services department, a technical department, and aircraft squadron. On 2 June 1993 the unit was renamed 2nd Army Aviation Repairs Unit. On 1 September 1996 the unit was renamed 2nd Army Aviation Support Regiment "Orione". In 2012 the regiment was assigned to the Army Aviation Support Command, which on 31 July 2019 was renamed Army Aviation Support Brigade.

Naming 
Since the 1975 army reform Italian army aviation units are named for celestial objects: support regiments are numbered with a single digit and named for one of the 88 modern constellations. As in 1996 the 2nd Army Aviation Repairs Unit was supporting the 5th Army Aviation Regiment "Rigel", which was named for Rigel, the brightest star in the Orion constellation, the army decided to name the new 2nd Army Aviation Support Regiment "Orione" to affirm the two regiments' relationship.

As the regiment was founded in the city of Bologna the regiment's coats of arms fourth quarter depicts Bologna's coat of arms.

Current Structure 
As of 2022 the 2nd Army Aviation Support Regiment "Orione" consists of:

  2nd Army Aviation Support Regiment "Orione", at Borgo Panigale Airport
 Headquarters Unit
 Command and Logistic Support Squadron
 Maintenance Unit
 1st Repair Squadron
 2nd Repair Squadron
 3rd Repair Squadron
 Technical and Test Section
 Air-materiel Supply Section
 External Work Section
 Flight Squadron (AB206 helicopters)

See also 
 Army Aviation

External links
 Italian Army Website: 2° Reggimento Sostegno Aviazione dell'Esercito "Orione"

References

Army Aviation Regiments of Italy